The 1957 Baltimore Orioles season involved the Orioles finishing 5th in the American League with a record of 76 wins and 76 losses.

Offseason
 February 8, 1957: Jim Brideweser was purchased by the Orioles from the Detroit Tigers.

Regular season

Season standings

Record vs. opponents

Notable transactions 
 June 24, 1957: Jack Fisher was signed as an amateur free agent by the Orioles.
 September 19, 1957: Eddie Miksis was selected off waivers by the Orioles from the St. Louis Cardinals.
 September 19, 1957: Morrie Martin was purchased from the Orioles by the St. Louis Cardinals.

Roster

Player stats

Batting

Starters by position 
Note: Pos = Position; G = Games played; AB = At bats; H = Hits; Avg. = Batting average; HR = Home runs; RBI = Runs batted in

Other batters 
Note: G = Games played; AB = At bats; H = Hits; Avg. = Batting average; HR = Home runs; RBI = Runs batted in

Pitching

Starting pitchers 
Note: G = Games pitched; IP = Innings pitched; W = Wins; L = Losses; ERA = Earned run average; SO = Strikeouts

Other pitchers 
Note: G = Games pitched; IP = Innings pitched; W = Wins; L = Losses; ERA = Earned run average; SO = Strikeouts

Relief pitchers 
Note: G = Games pitched; W = Wins; L = Losses; SV = Saves; ERA = Earned run average; SO = Strikeouts

Farm system 

LEAGUE CHAMPIONS: Phoenix

Notes

References 

1957 Baltimore Orioles team at Baseball-Reference
1957 Baltimore Orioles season at baseball-almanac.com

Baltimore Orioles seasons
Baltimore Orioles season
Baltimore Orio